Filobacillus is a genus of bacteria within the phylum Bacillota. It contains the type and only species, Filobacillus milensis, though other species and strains have been isolated. Species in this genus are generally halotolerant.

References 

Bacteria genera
Bacillaceae
Monotypic bacteria genera